Said may refer to:
 Said, Bavi
 Said, Ramshir
 Said, Shush